John Frederick Byrne (born 1 February 1961) is a former professional footballer who played for the Republic of Ireland and various clubs in England and France in the 1980s and 1990s.

Club career
Born in Manchester, Lancashire, Byrne began his career with York City and came to the attention of Queens Park Rangers during the League Cup match between the sides in 1984. He joined QPR in October 1984, making his debut against Norwich City.

He was a highly skilful player and once famously dribbled half the length of the pitch to score against Chelsea in a 6–0 victory in 1986. Shortly afterwards Byrne played at Wembley in the League Cup Final against Oxford United but ended up on the losing side.

Byrne moved from QPR to the French club Le Havre, in 1988, at the same time that his compatriot Frank Stapleton would move there from Ajax. He would remain at Le Havre one season longer than Stapleton before returning to England, in 1990, to play with Brighton & Hove Albion.

He would have spells with Sunderland, Millwall, and Oxford but returning to Brighton, on loan in 1993 before finishing his career there in 1996.

With Sunderland, he had the distinction of scoring in every round of the 1992 FA Cup except the final, which Liverpool won 2–0 with goals from Michael Thomas and Ian Rush, although he revealed in a pitch-side interview following the game that he was mistakenly handed a winner's medal.

Byrne played Sussex County League football for Shoreham before spending two seasons as joint manager with Russell Bromage. In 2001, aged 40, Byrne returned to Sussex County League football for Whitehawk, under his former Brighton & Hove Albion teammate Ian Chapman, although his appearances were restricted by work commitments.

International career
Byrne was called up to international duty under Eoin Hand's reign as Irish manager. With his first game being an international friendly against Italy. The game played at Dalymount Park, on 5 February 1985, finished 2–1 to the Italians.

Byrne would go on to earn 23 caps for the Republic of Ireland, and was in their squads for Euro 88 and the 1990 World Cup but didn't play any part. His best day in a green shirt came when he scored two fine goals in the 3–1 win over Turkey played in the BJK İnönü Stadium in Istanbul as part of the qualification  for Euro 92. He donned the green jersey for the last time in an international friendly against Wales. The game, which finished in a 2–1 victory for Ireland, would also be Bernie Slaven's last international duty.

Honours
York City
Football League Fourth Division: 1983-84

Later career
Byrne is now a musculoskeletal podiatrist with the NHS based in Sussex. He received finance and backing from the PFA for his university training.

See also
 List of Republic of Ireland international footballers born outside the Republic of Ireland

References

External links

Interview with Byrne by the FA

1961 births
Living people
Footballers from Manchester
English footballers
Republic of Ireland association footballers
Republic of Ireland expatriate association footballers
Republic of Ireland international footballers
Expatriate footballers in France
Irish expatriate sportspeople in France
Association football forwards
York City F.C. players
Queens Park Rangers F.C. players
Le Havre AC players
Brighton & Hove Albion F.C. players
Sunderland A.F.C. players
Millwall F.C. players
Oxford United F.C. players
Whitehawk F.C. players
1990 FIFA World Cup players
UEFA Euro 1988 players
English people of Irish descent
English Football League players
Ligue 2 players
FA Cup Final players